Hélène Loiselle (March 17, 1928 – August 7, 2013) was a Canadian actress living and working in Quebec.

Life 
She was born in Montreal and studied acting with Charlotte Boisjoli, François Rozet,  and  during the 1940s. Loiselle joined the theatre troupe Compagnons de Saint-Laurent and performed works by Jean Giraudoux, Racine, Edmond Rostand and Shakespeare. She spent two years in the early 1950s in Paris developing her technique.

In 1995, Loiselle received a Prix Gémeaux for her role in the television drama . She also played several witches in the popular Radio Canada television show for children Fanfreluche.

Loiselle married the comedian ; he died in 2000.

In 2006, she received the Prix Denise-Pelletier.

She died at the age of 85 after suffering from Alzheimer's disease for a number of years.

Her brother Hubert Loiselle was also a well-known Quebec actor.

Selected performances

Film 
 Mon oncle Antoine - 1971
 Françoise Durocher, Waitress - 1972
 Orders (Les Ordres) - 1974
 Post Mortem - 1999
 The Bottle (La bouteille) - 2000
 Marriages (Mariages) - 2001
 The White Chapel (Une chapelle blanche) - 2005
 Gilles - 2008

Theatre 
 Les Belles-sœurs by Michel Tremblay at Théâtre du Rideau Vert (1968)
 En Pièces Détachées by Michel Tremblay at Théâtre de Quat'Sous (1969)
  by Michel Tremblay at Théâtre de Quat'Sous (1971)
 A Streetcar Named Desire by Tennessee Williams with the company Compagnie Jean-Duceppe (1974)
 Les Chaises by Eugene Ionesco at Théâtre de Quat'Sous (1991)
 La Leçon d'anatomie by Larry Tremblay at Théâtre de Quat'Sous (1992)
 Yerma by Federico García Lorca at Théâtre du Rideau Vert (1993)
 La Cantatrice chauve'' by Eugene Ionesco at Théâtre du Rideau Vert (1996)

References

External links 
 

1928 births
2013 deaths
Actresses from Montreal
Canadian women comedians
Comedians from Montreal
Prix Denise-Pelletier winners